The Blind River Beavers are a Junior "A" ice hockey team from Blind River, Ontario, Canada.  They are a part of the Northern Ontario Junior Hockey League (NOJHL).

History
The Blind River Beavers had a long history in the International Junior B Hockey League.  In 2000, Junior A hockey was brought to Blind River as the Blind River Barons when the franchise moved from Nickel Centre. The team re-branded to the Blind River Beavers in fall 2001. The team has finished as high as fourth on a few occasions and made the playoffs but have failed to advance to the second round as of 2016.

The Beavers introduced a new logo at the start of the 2014–15 season. During that season, the Blind River Beavers set Northern Ontario Junior Hockey League records for fewest wins and points in a season as they went 0–51–1 during the regular season. The previous records were held by the 1991–92 Elliot Lake Vikings, who went 1–47–0 for 2 points. They also failed to win a game during their first round playoff series with the Soo Thunderbirds, losing that series 4-games-to-0.

The team showed improvement during the 2015–16, improving their record to 10–40–0–4, but not enough to make the playoffs as the Beavers finished three points behind Espanola for the final playoff spot in the West Division. The Beavers were led offensively by Max Khull, who had a team high 38 points. 

At the end of the season, the Beavers hired Soo Thunderbirds assistant Kyle Brick to be their new head coach and named Dennis Lawrence as their general manager. They also hired several new scouts from the Thunderbirds as they had recently changed ownership. The 2016–17 season saw the Beavers earn their first winning record since 2010–11. Blind River improved to 32–20–4–0 finishing 20 points behind the Thunderbirds and were second in the division. After the regular season, the Beavers beat the Rayside-Balfour Canadians in the quarterfinals in seven games followed by beating the Soo Eagles in five games leading to their first finals appearance, which they were swept by the Powassan Voodoos in four games.

Season-by-season results

Head coaches
 Kyle Brick (2016–present)
 Brad Barton (2015–16)
 Bart Jarrett
 Don Gagnon
 Angelo Gallo
 Todd Stencill
 Doug McEwen
 Jim Capy
 Al Monforth

References

External links
Blind River Beavers

Northern Ontario Junior Hockey League teams
1999 establishments in Ontario
Ice hockey clubs established in 1999